The Ambassador Extraordinary and Plenipotentiary of Ukraine to Finland is the ambassador of Ukraine to Finland. The current ambassador is Olga Dibrova. She assumed the position on 19 October 2020.

The first Ukrainian ambassador to Finland assumed his post in 1992, the same year a Ukrainian embassy opened in Helsinki.

List of ambassadors

Ukrainian People's Republic
 1918–1919 Kostiantyn Losky
 1919 Mykola Zalizniak
 1919–1920 Volodymyr Kedrowsky
 1920–1922 Petro Slyvenko

Ukraine
 1993–1997 Kostyantyn Masyk (Ambassador of Ukraine to Finland and concurrently to Sweden)
 1997–2001 Ihor Podolyev
 2001–2003 Petro Sardachuk
 2003–2007 Oleksandr Maidannyk
 2007–2012 Andrii Deshchytsia
 2012–2013  Oleksiy Selin (acting)
 2013–2014  Serhey Vasylenko (acting)
 20 August 2014–16 May 2019   
 2019–2020  Ilya Kvas (acting)
 2020–2020   (acting)
 Since 19 October 2020  Olga Dibrova

External links 
  Embassy of Ukraine to Finland: Previous Ambassadors

 
Finland
Ukraine